Edward Finch-Hatton (c.1697 – 16 May 1771) of Kirby Hall, near Rockingham, Northamptonshire, was a British diplomat and politician who sat in the House of Commons for 41 years from 1727 to 1768.

Early life
Finch was born Hon. Edward Finch, 5th son of Daniel Finch, 2nd Earl of Nottingham, and of his second wife, Hon. Anne Hatton, daughter and in her issue sole heiress of Christopher Hatton, 1st Viscount Hatton.  He was educated at a school at Isleworth and was admitted at Trinity College, Cambridge on 10 October 1713, aged 16, where he obtained an M.A. in 1718. He then went on the Grand Tour from 1720 to 1723, visiting France, Italy and Hanover.

Diplomatic and political career
In 1724, Finch began a diplomatic career, representing Great Britain as envoy-extraordinary to the imperial diet of Regensburg in the winter of 1724 to 1725, then successively as Minister to Poland, Sweden and Russia between 1725 and 1742. He was returned as Member of Parliament for Cambridge University at the 1727 British general election.   He spent the longest period as minister in Stockholm, from 1728 to 1739 and is recorded as only voting once in Parliament over that period although he was returned for Cambridge University again in  1734 and 1741. On his return to England in 1742, he was appointed groom of the bedchamber to the King, a post he held despite changes of government until 1756. He spoke on the Address on 16 November 1742, giving an account of all his negotiations and spoke against an opposition motion of 6 December 1743 for discontinuing the Hanoverian troops on British pay. He was returned unopposed again at the 1747 British general election.

At the 1754 general election Finch was returned unopposed for Cambridge University, and stood unsuccessfully for Rutland. For the rest of his career he generally supported the current Administration. He became Master of the Robes and Keeper of the Privy Purse in June 1757 and Surveyor of the King's Private Roads in November 1760. He was returned again in 1761 but declined standing at the 1768.

Later life and legacy
Finch married Ann Palmer, daughter of Sir Thomas Palmer, 4th Baronet, of Wingham on 15 August 1746, by special licence, at the house of his older brother, Daniel Finch, 8th Earl of Winchilsea, in Sackville Street, Mayfair. In 1764, took the additional surname Hatton in accordance with the will of his great aunt Anne Hatton, when he inherited property from her.

Finch and his wife had two sons and three daughters:

 George Finch-Hatton, FRS, MP (30 June 1747 – 17 February 1823).
 Anne Finch-Hatton (b. 17 November 1750).
Harriett Frances Charlotte Finch-Hatton (b. 19 February 1752). marry Sir Jenison William Gordon, 2nd Baronet.
Mary Henrietta Elizabeth Finch-Hatton (b. 12 May 1754).
John Emilius Daniel Edward Finch-Hatton (b. 19 May 1755).

Their eldest son George became an MP, and was succeeded in turn by his own son George Finch-Hatton, who became the 10th Earl of Winchilsea.

References

|-

1697 births
1771 deaths
Alumni of Trinity College, Cambridge
Members of the Parliament of Great Britain for English constituencies
Members of the Parliament of Great Britain for Cambridge University
British MPs 1727–1734
British MPs 1734–1741
British MPs 1741–1747
British MPs 1747–1754
British MPs 1754–1761
British MPs 1761–1768
Younger sons of earls
Ambassadors of Great Britain to Sweden
Ambassadors of Great Britain to Russia
Ambassadors of Great Britain to Poland
Edward